Al-Tamimi, in full Abu Abd Allah Mohammed ibn Qasim ibn Abd ar-Rahman ibn al-Karim al-Tamimi al-Fasi (born 1140/5, died 1207/8) was a Moroccan Arab hadith scholar and biographer, author of Al-Mustafad fi manaqib al-ubbad bi-madinat Fas wa ma yaliha min al-bilad. Al-Tamimi hailed from the Banu Tamim tribe which settled in al-Maghreb and al-Andalus. 

This book comprises 81 biographies of Moroccan saints. He wrote a fahrasa in which he recorded the names of his teachers and the works he studied under them, called An-Najm al-mushiqa (The resplendent Star). He studied under Abu Madyan. There are also many references to At-Tamimi in the work of Ibn al-Arabi.

References

Moroccan writers
Moroccan biographers
Moroccan Maliki scholars
1140s births
1207 deaths
People from Fez, Morocco
12th-century Moroccan writers
13th-century Moroccan people
12th-century jurists
13th-century jurists
12th-century Arabs